Zionsville Community High School (ZCHS) is a 4-year public high school located in Boone County, Zionsville, Indiana, United States. It is the only high school in the Zionsville Community School Corporation.

History
The high school was established in 1885 and graduated its first class in 1888. At that time it was located in the second-floor chapel of "The Academy", a small, brick, school house built in 1867 on Walnut Hill.  Today, that site is the home of Hussey-Mayfield Memorial Public Library. In 1910, it was commissioned as Eagle Township High School. The Chapel building was torn down in 1922 and replaced in 1924. The gymnasium was finished in 1925.

The school remained at that location until 1968 when the first section of the current building was constructed on Whitestown Road, although some residents raised concern that the school did not include a gymnasium. In 1970, the name was changed to Zionsville Community High School, when a new school corporation, Eagle-Union Community School Corporation, was formed by the merger of Eagle and Union township schools. The old Eagle Township High School buildings were torn down in 1978, with the exception of the gymnasium. Called the "Nest", the school continued to use it as the home court of the basketball teams until 1998, when a gym on the new campus opened.

In 2003, the new performing arts center opened, and the freshman center and aquatics center opened in 2005. At the end of the 2009 football season, the original football stadium was torn down and a new multi-purpose stadium opened in 2010.

Extracurricular activities 
ZCHS has two competitive show choirs, the mixed-gender "Royalaires" and the all-female "Choralaires". Both Royalaires and Choralaires have won regional-level competitions in their respective divisions, and Choralaires won their division in all four of their 2016 competitions.

State championships 
Indiana High School Athletic Association state championships:

Indiana Percussion Association state championships:

Indiana State School Music Association state championships:

In addition, the school's Quiz Bowl team won the Indiana State Quiz Bowl tournament in 2010 and 2011, as well as the National Academic Championship in 2010 and 2017.

Notable alumni 
Philip M. Bilden (1982), businessman
A. J. Corrado (2010), soccer player
Bill Hodges (1961), basketball coach
Dylan Mares (2010), soccer player
Tom Mastny (1999), baseball player
Cory Miller (2006), soccer player
Kendall Phillips (2007), singer
Nathan Sprenkel (2009), soccer player
Brad Stevens (1995), basketball coach
Mason Jobst, ice hockey player

See also
 List of high schools in Indiana

References

External links

Zionsville Community High School homepage
Indiana Department of Education snapshot of ZCHS

Public high schools in Indiana
Schools in Boone County, Indiana
1885 establishments in Indiana
Educational institutions established in 1885